HV or hv or variant, is a two-letter acronym which may refer to:

Places
 Burkina Faso (WMO country code HV, from the former French name, "Haute Volta" -- Upper Volta)
 Hudson Valley, New York State, USA

Groups, companies, organizations
 Transavia (IATA airline code HV)
 Hendrik Vermeulen, a South African fashion label

Military units
 Heimevernet, a Norwegian military force
 Hemvärnet, a Swedish military force
 Hrvatska Vojska, the Croatian army
 , the Danish home guard

Electronics and electrics
 High voltage, in electricity distribution
 hectovolt (hV), a unit of 100 volts
 Hasselblad HV, a digital system camera based on the Sony α SLT-A99V
 Home video, pre-recorded media for home entertainment

Transportation
 High Volume, a term often used for kayak sizes
 Hybrid vehicles, which use two or more distinct types of power
 Hydrogen vehicle, powered by hydrogen

Science and technology
 Absolute visual magnitude, or V-band magnitude, HV
 Mitochondrial DNA Haplogroup HV
 Hypervelocity star, an astronomical object or as a designation of such in a star catalogue
 hν, light, in chemistry shorthand
 Vickers Hardness, a hardness test

Other uses
 Holcomb Valley Scout Ranch
 Holiday village, a holiday resort where the visitors stay in villas
 Hwair, a Gothic letter, called hv in Unicode
 Humanae vitae, a papal encyclical
 High Valyrian, a fictional language used in the Song of Ice and Fire series by David J. Peterson

See also

 
 
 
 
 HV71, a Swedish ice hockey club